Kilindi is one of eleven administrative districts of Tanga Region in Tanzania. It is bordered to the east by the Handeni District and Handeni Town Council, to the south west  by the Kiteto District and north west by the Simanjiro District of Manyara Region. Kilindi District is bordered to the south by Gairo District and Kilosa District of Morogoro Region. The district created from Handeni District in 2002. The district seat (capital) is the town of Songe. According to the 2012 census, the district has a total population of 236,833.

Etymology 
Kilindi district is named after the Kilindi Dynasty that ruled over western Tanga in the 18-20th century.

Administrative subdivisions
As of 2012, Kilindi District was administratively divided into 21 wards.

Wards

References

Districts of Tanga Region